Johnie Earl Cooks (born November 23, 1958) is a former professional American football player who was drafted by the Baltimore Colts as the second overall pick in the 1982 NFL Draft.  A 6'4", . linebacker from Mississippi State University, Cooks played in ten NFL seasons from 1982 to 1991 for the Colts, New York Giants, and Cleveland Browns.  He was a member of the Giants when they defeated the Buffalo Bills 20–19 in Super Bowl XXV.

Cooks was inducted into the Mississippi Sports Hall of Fame in 2004.

College career
Johnie Cooks played college football at Mississippi State where he earned four letters, and earned a degree in physical education. During his college career, he amassed 373 tackles, 241 of those unassisted. During his junior year, he recorded a career high 24 tackles in a game against Auburn. He was also the defensive MVP in the 1981 Hall of Fame Bowl. He was named a 1st team SEC and 1st team AP All-American.

Professional career
Cooks was the second overall draft choice, selected in the first round of the 1982 NFL Draft by the Baltimore Colts. He started only two games in his rookie season, but by the end of the season, he had 63 tackles, one sack, and one fumble recovery. In 1983, he was moved to the outside linebacker position, this time recording 67 tackles that year. He also had a 52-yard fumble return in overtime against the New England Patriots that won the game for Baltimore. After having only 5 quarterback sacks in 1983, Cooks recorded , which led the Colts. His best game occurred against the Raiders, when he sacked the quarterback Jim Plunkett 4 times.

In 1988 Cooks was released by the Colts and was picked up by the New York Giants. After playing for years on mediocre Colts teams Cooks won a Super Bowl title when the Giants defeated the Buffalo Bills. He was released by the Giants in 1991 and signed with the Cleveland Browns in 1992. Nagging injuries caused Cooks to retire after the 1992 season.

References

1958 births
Living people
People from Leland, Mississippi
Players of American football from Mississippi
American football linebackers
Mississippi State Bulldogs football players
Baltimore Colts players
Indianapolis Colts players
New York Giants players
Cleveland Browns players